Sagdidae is a family of air-breathing land snails, terrestrial pulmonate gastropod mollusks with highest diversity in the Greater Antilles. It has been classified in its own superfamily Sagdoidea and as a member of the superfamily Helicoidea. Some species of Sagdidae are ovoviviparous.

Anatomy 
Vestigial love darts exist in some species within this family.

Subfamilies and genera 
The family Sagdidae consists of the following subfamilies:
 Aquebaninae H. B. Baker, 1940
 Platysuccineinae H. B. Baker, 1940
 Polydontinae Schileyko, 2006
 Sagdinae Pilsbry, 1895
 Yunqueinae Schileyko, 1998

Genera in the family Sagdidae include:

The type genus is Sagda Beck, 1837.

 Aerotrochus
 Aquebana
 Corneosagda
 Granodomus Wurtz, 1955
 Hispaniolana Pilsbry, 1933
 Hojeda
 Hyalosagda
 Lacteoluna
 Meiophysema
 Microsagda
 Odontosagda - Odontosagda blandii
 Platysuccinea
 Proserpinula
 Sagda
 Stauroglypta
 Strialuna
 Suavitas
 Trifaux
 Vilitas
 Volvidens
 Xenodiscula
 Zaphysema

References

External links 

 Gary Rosenberg & Igor V. Muratov. Recent terrestrial molluscs of Jamaica
 

 
Taxa named by Henry Augustus Pilsbry
Gastropod families
Helicoidei